Black Business is the third album from hip hop group Poor Righteous Teachers. It was released on September 14, 1993, under Profile Records. Black Business is the group's last album with any production by Tony D.

Track listing

Album chart positions

Singles chart positions

References

External links

1993 albums
Poor Righteous Teachers albums
Profile Records albums